St. Emery Church or Saint Emeric's Church or variations honoring Saint Emeric of Hungary may refer to:

 St. Emery Church (Fairfield, Connecticut)
St. Emeric's Church (New York City)